Mopani is a rest camp in Kruger National Park, South Africa. It lies along the northern shore of the Pioneer Dam on the Tsendze River.

Activities 
Mopani is one of the first camps to offer a Sunset Drive-Boma Braai combo activity. This is a combination of the standard Sunset Drive game drive and Boma Braai (a catered braai in a boma near the camp). They also offer guided bush walks, game drives, bush breakfasts and bush braais. The western portion of the camp contains a walking trail along the fence, with views of the lake.

Nearby attractions 

There is a sign and parking space on the road north of camp at the tropic. It is allowed to exit your vehicle in this spot. Immediately south of camp on the south side of the river (although a  drive away) is the Pioneer Dam Bird Hide, as well as the Shipandani sleep-over Hide.

Facilities 
In addition to the restaurant, shop, laundromat and filling station, Mopani provides a conference centre with space for up to 300 people.

Accommodation 
Mopani is a cottage-only lodge, providing no camping facilities. It is able to sleep up to 498 people in a variety of bungalows, cottages and guest cottages. The Xanatseni guest house is able to sleep an additional 8 people.

Shipandani sleep-over bird hide 
On the south bank of the Tsendze river a short way downstream of Mopani is the Shipandani sleep-over bird hide. While a standard hide during the day, it can be booked as accommodation for 2-6 guests. The hide provides fairly primitive accommodation, with no electricity and an outdoor toilet. An outdoor kitchen, including cutlery and crockery, is also available for guests.

References 

Kruger National Park